The 1932 Howard Bulldogs football team was an American football team that represented Howard College (now known as the Samford University) as a member of the Dixie Conference during the 1932 college football season. In their fourth year under head coach Eddie McLane, the team compiled an overall record of record of 3–7 with a mark of 2–4 in conference play, placing eighth in the Dixie Conference.

Schedule

References

Howard
Samford Bulldogs football seasons
Howard Bulldogs football